Singapore competed at the 1962 British Empire and Commonwealth Games in Perth, Western Australia, from 22 November to 1 December 1962.

Medalists

See also
 Singapore at the 1960 Summer Olympics
 Malaysia at the 1964 Summer Olympics

References

1962
Nations at the 1962 British Empire and Commonwealth Games
British Empire and Commonwealth Games